Booth House is a prominent heritage building in Ottawa, Ontario, Canada located at 252 Metcalfe Street, just south of Somerset in Downtown Ottawa. The house was built by lumber baron John R. Booth in 1906, and it was designed by John W.H. Watts, who did a number of other Ottawa buildings.

It remained in the Booth family until 1947, when it then became home of the Laurentian Club, one of Ottawa's leading clubs. The club closed in 2000, however, and the property was bought by Trinity Western University to house its academic-internship program, the Laurentian Leadership Centre. It now houses Trinity Western students who are interning in various governmental, cultural, business, journalistic, or non-governmental offices.

In 1990, the building was designated a National Historic Site of Canada.

References

Houses in Ottawa
Designated heritage properties in Ottawa
Trinity Western University
National Historic Sites in Ontario